Michael Marx (born 7 February 1960) is a German former cyclist. He won the bronze medal in the team pursuit along with Rolf Gölz, Reinhard Alber and Roland Günther in the 1984 Summer Olympics.

References

1960 births
Living people
German male cyclists
Cyclists at the 1984 Summer Olympics
Olympic cyclists of West Germany
Olympic bronze medalists for West Germany
Olympic medalists in cycling
Cyclists from Hamburg
Medalists at the 1984 Summer Olympics